This is a list of cities and towns whose names were officially changed at one or more points in history. It does not include gradual changes in spelling that took place over long periods of time.

see also: Geographical renaming, List of names of European cities in different languages, and List of renamed places in the United States

Afghanistan
 Alexandria Ariana → Herat
 Alexandria Arachosia → Kandahar
 Alexandria in Opiania → Ghazni
 Alexandria on the Oxus → Ai-Khanoum
 Bactra → Balkh
 Adina Pur → Jalalabad

Algeria
Ikosium → Icosium → Algiers
Géryville → El Bayadh
Cirta → Constantine
Hippo Regius → Bône → Annaba
Rusicade → Philippeville →  Skikda
Castellum Tingitanum → Orléansville → El Asnam → Chlef
Malaca → Calama → Guelma
Colomb-Béchar → Béchar
Saint André de Mers-el-Kébir → Mers-el-Kébir
Saldae → Bougie → Béjaïa
Fort Laperrine → Tamanrasset

Angola

Argentina
La Plata → Ciudad Eva Perón → La Plata
Ciudad de la Santísima Trinidad y Puerto de Santa María del Buen Aire → Buenos Aires

Armenia

Australia

Ballaarat → Ballarat (VIC)
Bearbrass → Melbourne (VIC)
Belfast → Port Fairy (VIC)
Bendigo's Creek → Sandhurst → Bendigo (VIC)
Blackman's Flat → Orange (NSW)
Bryan Creek Crossing → Coleraine (VIC)
Currajong → Parkes (NSW)
Dumbletown → Beverly Hills (NSW)
Emerald Hill → South Melbourne (VIC)
Emu Bay → Burnie (TAS)
Flooding Creek → Sale (VIC)
Germanton → Holbrook (NSW)
Hummock Hill → Whyalla (SA)
Limestone Station → Ipswich (QLD)
Mayday Hills → Beechworth (NSW)
McGuire's Punt → Sheppardtown → Shepparton (VIC)
Mobilong → Murray Bridge (SA)
Newcastle → Toodyay (WA)
Port Darwin → Palmerston → Darwin (NT)
Stuart → Alice Springs (NT)

Austria
Fucking → Fugging (1836)
Fucking → Fugging (2021)
Mattersdorf → Mattersburg (1926)

Azerbaijan

Bangladesh

Belarus

Belgium
 Charnoy → Charleroi (1666)

Bolivia
 Charará → General Eugenio Alejandrino Garay (1955)
 Qusqu  → Cusco
 Fortín General Camacho / Fortín López de Filippis → Mariscal José Félix Estigarribia (1944)

Botswana
 Gaberones → Gaborone (1969)

Bosnia and Herzegovina
 Bosanska Dubica → Kozarska Dubica (1992)
 Bosanska Gradiška → Gradiška
 Bosanska Kostajnica → Kostajnica
 Bosanski Brod → Brod
 Bosanski Novi → Novi Grad
 Bosanski Šamac → Šamac
 Bosansko Petrovo Selo → Petrovo
 Delminium → Županjac → Županj-potok → Županjac → Duvno → Tomislavgrad → Duvno → Tomislavgrad
 Drvar → Titov Drvar (1981) → Drvar (1991)
 Hvoča → Foča → Srbinje → Foča
 Novi Travnik → Pucarevo (1980 - 1992)  → Novi Travnik
 Skender Vakuf → Kneževo

Brazil
Adolfo Konder → Vidal Ramos
Embu → Embu das Artes
Hamônia → Ibirama
Hansa Humboldt → Corupá
Jabaeté → Viana
Neu-Zürich → Dalbérgia → Neu Breslau → Presidente Getúlio
Nossa Senhora do Desterro → Florianópolis
Nova Danzig → Cambé
Filipeia de Nossa Senhora das Neves → Paraíba → João Pessoa
Porto dos Casais → Porto Alegre
Presidente Soares → Alto Jequitibá
São José da Barra do Rio Negro → Manaus
São José del Rey → Tiradentes
Veado → Siqueira Campos → Guaçuí
Vila do Espírito Santo → Vila Velha
Vila Nova do Espírito Santo → Vitória
Vila Rica → Ouro Preto
São Salvador → Bahia → Salvador, Brazil

Brunei
Brunei Town (Bandar Brunei) → Bandar Seri Begawan (1970)
Brooketon → Muara
Padang Berawa → Seria

Bulgaria
Ratiaria → Archar 
Asenovgrad → Stanimaka → Asenovgrad
Scaptopara → Cuma-i Bala (Yukarı Cuma) → Gorna Dzhumaya → Blagoevgrad
Orhanie → Botevgrad 
Pyrgos → Burgaz →Burgas
Hadzhioglu Pazardzhik → Tolbuhin → Dobrich
Dupniche → Marek → Stanke Dimitrov → Dupnitsa
Nevrokop → Gotse Delchev
Ortaköy → Ivailovgrad
Pautalia → Velbazhd → Köstendil → Kyustendil
Golyama Kutlovitsa → Kutlofça → Ferdinand → Mihailovgrad → Montana
Mesembria → Misivri→ Nesebar
Tatar Pazardzhik → Pazardzhik
Kendros (Kendrisos/Kendrisia) → Odryssa → Eumolpia → Philipopolis → Trimontium → Ulpia → Flavia → Julia → Paldin/Ploudin → Poulpoudeva → Filibe → Plovdiv 
Anchialos → Tuthom → Anhyolu → Anhialo → Pomorie
Ruschuk (Rusčuk) → Rousse
Şumnu → Shumen → Kolarovgrad → Shumen
Durostorum → Dorostol → Drastar → Silistre → Silistra
Bashmakli → Ahiçelebi → Smolyan
Serdica → Sredets → Triaditsa → Sofya →Sofia
Beroe → Vereya (Beroya) → Ulpia Augusta Trajana → Irinopolis → Boruy → Vereya → Eski Zağra → Zheleznik → Stara Zagora 
Golyamo Konare → Saedinenie
Eski Dzhumaia (Eski Cuma) → Targovishte
Vassiliko → Tsarevo → Michurin → Tsarevo
Odesos → Varna → Stalin → Varna
Tarnovgrad → Tarnovo → Tırnova → Tarnovo → Veliko Tarnovo
Bononia → Bdin → Vidin

Canada

Alberta
Hobbema → Maskwacis

British Columbia
Fort George → Prince George
Fort Camosun → Fort Victoria → Victoria
Westbank → West Kelowna
Granville → Vancouver
ch’átlich → Sechelt

Manitoba
Prince of Wales Fort → Churchill

New Brunswick
Fort LaTour → Saint John
Léger Corner → Dieppe
Ste. Anne's Point → Fredericton

Nunavut
Frobisher Bay → Iqaluit
Repulse Bay → Naujaat

Ontario

Hens and Chickens Harbour → Collingwood
New Johnstown → Cornwall
Rat Portage → Kenora
Fort Frontenac → Kingston
Ebytown → Berlin → Kitchener (see Berlin to Kitchener name change)
Newark → Niagara-on-the-Lake
Bytown → Ottawa
Shipman's Corners → St. Catharines
Sainte-Anne-des-Pins → Sudbury → Greater Sudbury
Fort Rouillé → Toronto → York → Toronto
Aqueduct → Merritsville → Welland

Prince Edward Island
Port la Joie → Charlottetown

Québec
Asbestos → Val-des-Sources
Hochelaga → Ville-Marie → Mont-Royal → Montreal
Hull → Gatineau

Saskatchewan
Prussia → Leader
Pile of Bones → Regina

Chad

Faya → Largeau → Faya-Largeau → Faya (proposed)
Fort Archambault → Sarh
Fort-Foureau → Kousséri
Fort Lamy → N'Djamena

Chile
 Barrancas → Pudahuel
 Estación Rinconada → Laja
 La Greda → La Unión → Pisco Elqui
 Lago Buenos Aires → Chile Chico
 Mincha → Canela
 Monterrey → Monte Patria
 Navarino → Cabo de Hornos
 Nuestra Señora de las Mercedes de Puerto Claro → Valparaíso
 Nuestra Señora de las Mercedes de Tutuvén → Cauquenes
 Nueva Bilbao → Constitución
 Pueblo Hundido → Diego de Almagro
 Punta Arenas → Magallanes City → Punta Arenas
 Rinconada de Parral → Retiro
 Samo Alto → Río Hurtado
 San Carlos de Chiloé → Ancud
 San José de Logroño → Melipilla
 Santa Cruz de Triana → Rancagua
 Yungay → Quinta Normal

China
Amoy† → Hsia-men† → Xiamen
Ji → Yanjing → Zhongdu → Dadu → Jingshi → Khanbalik (as Mongol capital) → Peking † → Peiping → Beijing
Fenghao → Chang'an or Xijing → Daxing → Fengyuan → Anxi → Jingzhao → Xi'an
Iling → Ichang† → Yichang
Jiankang → Jiangning → Jinling → Nanking† → Nanjing
Bianliang → Bianjing → Kaifeng
Lin'an → Hangchow† → Hangzhou
Soochow† → Suzhou
Yinxu → Anyang
Shenyang → Shengjing → Fengtianfu → Mukden → Fengtian → Shenyang
Ch'ing-ni-wa → Lüshunkou (aka Port Arthur) → Dalnyi → Dairen; Ryojun → Lüda→ Dalian
Kweisui† → Guisui → Hohhot
Tihua† → Dihua → Ürümqi
Changchun → Hsinking → Changchun

†Name change in English due to replacement of postal romanization with the pinyin system. The Chinese name is unchanged.

Colombia
Bacatá → Santa Fe de Bacatá → Bogotá → Santa Fe de Bogotá → Bogotá
Obando → Puerto Inírida → Inirida
Patriarca San José → Cúcuta → San José de Cucúta → Cúcuta
Valle de Upar → Ciudad de los Santos Reyes de Valledupar → Valle Dupar → Valledupar
Nuestra Señora Santa María de los Remedios del Cabo de la Vela → Nuestra Señora de los Remedios del Río de la Hacha → Riohacha
Barbudo → Santiago de Sompayón → Tamalameque → Santiago de Sompayón Nuestra Señora de la Candelaria de El Banco → El Banco
San Jerónimo de Buenavista → Pereira
Apiay → Villavicencio
Pueblo Viejo → San Francisco de Quibdó → Quibdó
San Bonifacio de Ibagué del valle de las Lanzas → Ibagué
Villaviciosa de la Concepción de la Provincia de Hatunllacta → Villaviciosa de la Concepción de San Juan de los Pastos → San Juan de Pasto
San Antonio → Leticia
Santa Cruz de Pizarro → Santa Cruz de San José → Sitionuevo → Sitio Nuevo
Villa Holguín → Armenia

Democratic Republic of the Congo

Republic of the Congo

Croatia
 Militär Sanct Georgen → Đurđevac
 Ragusa → Dubrovnik
 Mursa → Essegg, Eszék → Osijek
 Sankt Veit am Fluß (German) → Fiume (Italian) → Rijeka
 Iader → Jadera → Zara → Zadar
 Agram, Zagrab → Zagreb
 Zaravecchia → Biograd na Moru
 Pinguente → Buzet
 Cherso → Cres
 Porto Re → Kraljevica
 Albona → Labin
 Lesina → Hvar
 Lussinpiccolo → Mali Lošinj
 Cittanova (d'Istria) → Novigrad
 Dignano → Vodnjan
 Ploče → Kardeljevo → Ploče

Czech Republic
Braunau → Broumov
Cukmantl (Zuckmantel) → Zlaté Hory
Falknov (Falkenau) → Sokolov
Frývaldov (Freiwaldau) → Jeseník
Německý Brod (Deutsch Brod) → Havlíčkův Brod
Německé Jablonné (Deutsch Gabel) → Jablonné v Podještědí
 Pilsen → Plzen
Unterwielands (Cmunt) → České Velenice → Gmünd-Bahnhof (Gmünd III) → České Velenice
Zlín (Zlin) → Gottwaldov → Zlín  
Budweis → České Budějovice
Karlsbad → Karlovy Vary
Reichenberg → Liberec
Ober-Thomasdorf → Waldenburg → Bělá pod Pradědem

Dominican Republic
Santo Domingo → Ciudad Trujillo (1936–1961) → Santo Domingo

Egypt
Many cities had Ancient Egyptian, Greek, and Latin names
Iunyt, Ta-senet → Latopolis → Laton → Lato → Esna

Equatorial Guinea
Port Clarence → Santa Isabel → Malabo

Estonia

Eswatini

Finland
Kokkola/Gamlakarleby → Kokkola/Karleby (1977, only the Swedish name changed)
Mustasaari/Mussor → Wasa → Nikolaistad/Nikolainkaupunki → Vasa/Vaasa
Pargas/Parainen → Väståboland/Länsi-Turunmaa (2009) → Pargas/Parainen (2012)
Pyhäjärvi → Pyhäsalmi (1993) → Pyhäjärvi (1996)

France
Most cities had an ancient name, usually in Latin, often of older Celtic origin
Andemantunum → Langres
Argentoratum → Strassburg → Strasbourg
Augustobona → Troyes
Augustodunum → Autun
Augustodurum → Bayeux
Augustonemetum → Clermont-Ferrand
Avaricum → Bourges
Caesarodunum → Tours
Cenabum → Cenabum Aureliani → Aurelianum → Orléans
Condevicnum → Portus Namnetum → Nantes
Divodurum → Metz
Divona → Cahors
Durocortorum → Reims
Elimberris → Auch
Forum Iulii → Fréjus
Gesocribate → Brest
Gesoriacum → Bononia → Boulogne-sur-Mer
Iuliomagus → Angers
Lapurdum → Bayonne
Limonum → Poitiers
Lugdunum Convenarum → Saint-Bertrand-de-Comminges
Lugdunum Consoranorum → Saint-Lizier
Lutetia → Paris
Mediolanium → Saintes
Mediolanum Aulercorum → Évreux
Nemetacum → Arras
Noviodunum Aeduorum → Nevirnum → Nevers
Samarobriva → Amiens
Segodunum → Rodez

The Gambia

Georgia

Germany

Aquae Mattiacorum → Wiesbaden
Augusta Vindelicorum → Augsburg
Aurelia Aquensi → Baden-Baden
Barmen-Elberfeld → Wuppertal
Bötzow → Oranienburg
Bremerhaven → Wesermünde → Bremerhaven
Buchhorn → Friedrichshafen
Chemnitz → Karl-Marx-Stadt (1953) → Chemnitz (1990)
Colonia Claudia Ara Agrippinensium → Köln (English: Cologne)
Colonia Nemetum → Speyer
Klenow → Ludwigslust
Lietzow → Lietzenburg → Charlottenburg
Lochau → Annaburg
Mogontiacum → Mainz
Münden → Hannoversch Münden → Hann. Münden
Neustadt → Dorotheenstadt (in 1710 incorporated into Berlin)
Rixdorf → Neukölln (in 1920 incorporated into Berlin)
Sarre-Louis → Sarre-Libre → Saarlouis → Saarlautern → Saarlouis
Syburg → Carlshaven → Bad Karlshafen
Stadt des KdF-Wagens bei Fallersleben → Wolfsburg
Stalinstadt → Eisenhüttenstadt
Starigard → Aldinborg → Oldenburg in Holstein
Treuorum → Trier
Vörde → Bremervörde

Greece

Greenland
Friedrichstal → Frederiksdal → Narsarmijit (Narsaq Kujalleq)
Godthaab (Godthåb) → Nuuk
Lichtenau → Alluitsoq
Lichtenfels → Akunnat
Neu-Herrnhut → Nye-Hernhut → Noorlit → Old Nuuk

Guyana
Wismar-MacKenzie-Christianburg → Linden

Hong Kong
Rennie's Mill → Tiu Keng Leng
Junk Bay → Tseung Kwan O
Castle Peak → Tuen Mun
Un Long → Yuen Long

Hungary

India

Indonesia
Bandar Aceh Darussalam → Kutaradja → Banda Aceh
Bandoeng → Bandung
Bangkahulu → Bencoolen → Bengkulu
Batavia Centrum → Central Jakarta
Dayeuh Sundasembawa → Chandrabhaga → Bhagasasi → Bagasi → Bekasi
Emma Haven → Teluk Bayur
Pakuan Pajajaran → Buitenzorg → Bogor 
Port Numbay → Hollandia → Kota Baru → Sukarnapura → Djajapura → Jayapura
Koepang → Kupang
Makasar → Ujungpandang → Makassar
Meester Cornelis → Djatinegara → Jatinegara
Pontianak Regency → Mempawah Regency
Muara Jati → Caruban → Cirebon → Cheribon → Cirebon
Soerabaia → Surabaja → Surabaya
Sunda Kelapa → Jayakarta (1527) → Batavia (1619) →  Djakarta (1942) → Jakarta (1972)
Oosthaven → Tanjungkarang-Telukbetung → Bandar Lampung
Tawang-Galunggung → Sukapura → Tasikmalaya
Telanaipura → Jambi
Wangsanayan → Senayan
Weltevreden → Sawah Besar

Iran

Ireland
Bagenalstown → Muine Bheag (1932)
Charleville → Ráth Luirc (1920s)
Cove → Queenstown (1849) → Cobh (1922)
Dún Laoghaire → Kingstown (1821) → Dún Laoghaire (1922)
Edgeworthstown → Mostrim (1935) → Edgeworthstown (1974)
Fethard → Fethard-on-Sea (1914)
Kells → Ceannanus Mór (1929) → Kells (1993)
Kingwilliamstown → Ballydesmond (1951)
Lisbrack → Newtownforbes (1750)
Maryborough → Portlaoise (1929)
Navan → An Uaimh (1922) → Navan (1971)
Newbridge → Droichead Nua (1930s)
Newtownbarry → Bunclody (1950)
Parsonstown → Birr (1920s)
Philipstown → Daingean (1922)
Baile Atha Cliath – Dublin

Israel

Nazareth Illit → Nof HaGalil (2019)

Italy

Japan
Akamagaseki → Shimonoseki (1902)
Asahi → Owariasahi (1970)
Edo → Tokyo (1868)
Fuchū → Shizuoka (1869)
Fukase → Matsumoto (1582)
Goka → Hiroshima (1591)
Heian-kyo → Kyoto (1899)
Hiroshima → Kitahiroshima (1996)
Hizaori → Asaka (1932)
Imahama → Nagahama (1575)
Inokuchi → Gifu (1568)
Ujiyamada → Ise, Mie (1955)
Kameyama → Kameoka (1869)
Kōriyama → Yamatokōriyama (1954)
Koromo → Toyota (1959)
Kozukata → Morioka (Keichō era)
Kurokawa → Wakamatsu → Aizuwakamatsu (1955)
Kurume → Higashikurume (1970)
Murayama → Musashimurayama (1970)
Nagaoka → Nagaokakyō (1972)
Naniwa → Ōsaka
Ōminatotanabu → Mutsu (1960)
Ōmiya → Hitachiōmiya (2004)
Oshi → Gyōda (1949)
Ōta → Hitachiōta (1954)
Ōtsu → Kotsu (672) → Ōtsu (794)
Ōtsu → Izumiōtsu (1942)
Sano → Izumisano (1948)
Sayama → Ōsakasayama (1987)
Shinobu → Fukushima (1592)
Takada → Bungotakada (1954)
Takada → Yamatotakada (1948)
Takada → Jōetsu (1971)
Takaoka → Hirosaki (1628)
Tambaichi → Tenri (1954)
Tanabe → Kyōtanabe (1997)
Tsudanuma → Narashino (1954)
Yamato → Higashiyamato (1970)
Yabo → Kunitachi (1926)

Jordan
Rabbath Ammon →  Philadelphia → Amman → Ahamant → Amman
Kerak → Al-Karak

Kazakhstan

Kenya
Broderick Falls → Webuye
Fort Hall → Muranga
Thompson Falls → Nyahururu

Kyrgyzstan

Laos
 Xiang Dong Xiang Thong → Vientiane (1561) → Luang Phra Bang (1695) → Vientiane
 Nakhon Kala Champaknaburisi → Nakhon Champa Nakhaburisi (1713) → Nakhon Champasak (1791) → Champasak [Bassac] (1863) →  Pakse (1908)

Latvia

Lebanon
 Heliopolis → Baalbek
 Derbly, Ahlia, Wahlia, Mahallata, Mayza, Kayza, Athar (Phoenician/Assyrian) → Tripolis (Greek, Latin) → Atrabulus, Tarablus al-Sham (Arabic) → Trablusşam (Turkish) → Tripoli

Libya
Oea → Tripoli
Euesperides → Berenice → Hesperides → Barneeq → Marsa ibn Ghazi → Bani Ghazi → Benghazi

Lithuania

Madagascar

Malawi

Mauritius
Port Louis → Port de La Montagne (1794) → Port Nord-Ouest (1795) → Port Napoléon (1803) → Port Louis (1810)

Malaysia
Jesselton → Kota Kinabalu (1968)
Port Swettenham → Port Klang (1963)
Victoria → Bandar Labuan
Jamestown → Bayan Lepas
Teluk Anson → Teluk Intan
Port Weld → Kuala Sepetang
Elopura → Sandakan
Prang Besar → Putrajaya
Tanjung Puteri → Iskandar Puteri → Johor Bahru
Nusajaya → Iskandar Puteri

Mexico
 Cajeme → Ciudad Obregón
 Ciudad Real → San Cristobal de las Casas
 Pitic → Hermosillo
 Querétaro → Santiago de Querétaro
 San Juan Bautista → Villahermosa
 Tenochtitlán → Ciudad de México
 Valladolid → Morelia
 Zapotlán → Ciudad Guzmán

Republic of Moldova

Montenegro
Berane → Ivangrad (1949) → Berane (1992)
Birziminium → Ribnica → Podgorica (1326) → Titograd (1946) → Podgorica (1992)

Morocco
Tingis → Tangier
Mazagan → El Jadida
Tamuda → Tetuán → Tetouan
Lixus → Larache
Port Lyautey → Kénitra
Anfa → Casablanca
Fedala → Mohammedia
Chellah → Rabat
Mogador → Essaouira
Zilis → Arcila → Asilah
Morocco – Marrakesh

Mozambique

Myanmar
In many cases, the English name of the city changed due to different romanization systems, while the Burmese native remained unchanged.

Arakan → Rakhine
Akyab → Sittwe
Amherst → Kyaikkami
Bassein → Pathein
Henzada → Hinthada
Maymyo → Pyin U Lwin
Moulmein → Mawlamyaing
Mergui → Myeik
Myohaung → Mrauk U
Pagan → Bagan
Pegu → Bago
Prome → Pyay
Dagon → Rangoon → Yangon
Sandoway → Thandwe
Syriam → Thanlyin
Karen → Kayin
Tavoy → Dawei
Tenasserim → Tanintharyi
Yaunghwe → Nyaung Shwe

Namibia

Netherlands 
Coriovallum (possible misspelling of Cortovallum) → Heerlen
Kuilenburg → Culemborg
Noviomagus Batavorum (or Batavodurum) → Nimwegen → Nijmegen
Traiectum → Traiectum ad Mosam → Maastricht
Traiectum → Ultra Traiectum → Utrecht
Forum Hadriani → Voorburg
Zwaagwesteinde → De Westereen

North Korea
Sinuiju → Shingishū† → Sinuiju
Wanggeom-seong → Pyongyang → Seogyeong → Pyongyang → Heijō† → Pyongyang
Wonsanjin → Genzan† → Wonsan
Songjin → Kimchaek (1952)
Songrim → Genjihō (1916) → Songrim (1945)

†Japanese name during Korea under Japanese rule (1910–1945). The Korean name is unchanged.

North Macedonia
 Veles → Titov Veles →Veles, North Macedonia

Norway
Christiania → Kristiania → Oslo (1925)
Kaupangen → Nidaros → Trondhjem → Nidaros → Trondheim
Fredrikshald → Halden
Bjørgvin → Bergen

Pakistan

Peru
 Ciudad de los Reyes → Lima
 San Pablo de Napeanos → Iquitos

Paraguay
Puerto Flor de Lis → Puerto Presidente Stroessner → Ciudad del Este
Ajos → Coronel Oviedo

Philippines

Poland

 Aleksandrowo → Aleksandrów Pograniczny → Aleksandrów Kujawski
 Jędrzychów → Andrzychów → Andrychów
 Barcino → Barcin
 Wartberge → Wartenburg → Nowowiejsk2 → Barczewo
 Brido → Wartha → Bardo
 Neu Berlin → Berlinchen → Barlinek
 Rosenthal → Bartenstein → Bartoszyce
 Barwica → Bärwalde1 → Barwice2
 Biała → Zülz1 → Biała2
 Gajle → Biała → Gehlen1 → Gehlenburg → Biała Piska2
 Brzegi → Białe Brzegi → Białobrzegi
 Biały Bór → Baldenburg1 → Biały Bór2
 Bielszczany Stok → Białystok
 Biała → Langenbielau1 → Bielawa2
 Lignica → Fürstenwald1 → Beroldestadt → Bernstadt → Bierutów2
 Bischofsburg → Biskupiec2
 Strowangen → Bischofstein → Bistein → Bisztynek2
 Błaszkowice → Błaszki
 Richnow → Reichenau1 → Rychwałd2 → Bogatynia
 Gross-Born → Borne Sulinowo2
 Brusseberge → Brunsberg → Braunsberg → Braniewo2
 Brwinowo → Brwinów
 Wysoki Brzeg → Brieg1 → Brzeg2
 Brzeg → Dyhernfurth → Brzeg Dolny2
 Busk → Busko → Busko Zdrój
 Bydgoszcz → Bromberg → Bydgoszcz2 → Bromberg → Bydgoszcz2
 Bystrzyce → Habelschwerdt1 → Bystrzyca Kłodzka
 Bytom → Beuthen an der Oder1 → Białobrzezie2 → Bytom Odrzański
 Łoza → Kulmsee1 → Chełmża2
 Freienwalde → Chociwel2
 Konice → Konigesberge1 → Königsberg in der Neumark → Chojna2
 Chorzów → Königshütte1 → Chorzów2
 Arnswalde → Choszczno2
 Tempelburg → Czaplinek2
 Czarne → Hammerstein1 → Czarne2 → Hammerstein1 → Czarne2
 Rothenburg → Czerwieńsk2
 Dęblin → Iwanogród → Dęblin
 Dzierzgoń → Neu Christburg1 → Christburg → Dzierzgoń2
 Reichenbach → Dzierżoniów2
 Łęg → Lyck → Ełk2
 Gdynia → Gdingen → Gdynia → Gotenhafen → Gdynia
 Gdańsk → Danzig → Gdańsk2
 Nowa Wieś → Lötzen → Giżycko2
 Głogów → Glogau → Głogów2
 Landsberg → Landsberg an der Warthe → Gorzów Wielkopolski2
 Nowy Włodzisław → Junowłodzisław → Inowłodzisław → Inowłocław → Inowrocław → Hohensalza → Inowrocław → Hohensalza → Inowrocław
 Biała → Janów → Janów Lubelski
 Hirschberg → Jelenia Góra2
 Kattowitz → Katowice → Stalinogród → Katowice
 Wietrzna Góra → Kazimierz → Kazimierz Dolny
 Rast → Rastenburg → Kętrzyn
 Kladsko → Glatz → Kłodzko
 Kołobrzeg → Kolberg → Kołobrzeg2
 Koszalin → Köslin → Koszalin2
 Hurthland → Friedland → Korfantów2
 Lignica → Liegnitz1 → Legnica2
 Łódź → Lodsch → Łódź → Litzmannstadt1 → Łódź2
 Marienburg → Malbork → Marienburg → Malbork2
 Berenwalde → Bärwalde → Mieszkowice2
 Mieńsk → Mińsk → Nowomińsk → Mińsk Mazowiecki
 Sensburg → Mrągowo
 Florianów → Narol
 Nowe Miasto Korczyn → Nowy Korczyn
 Margrabowa → Treuburg1 → Olecko2
 Pazluk → Hollandt1 → Preußisch Holland → Pasłęk2
 Piasek → Piaski Luterskie → Piaski
 Melcekuke → Mehlsack → Pieniężno2
 Pisz → Johannisburg1 → Pisz2
 Przemków → Primkenow1 → Primkenau1 → Przemków2
 Puławy → Nowa Aleksandria → Puławy
 Prudnik → Neustadt → Prądnik2 → Prudnik
 Słupsk → Stolp1 → Słupsk2
 Stargard Szczeciński → Stargard (2016)
 Stettin → Szczecin2
 Ortulfsburg → Ortelsburg → Szczytno2
 Rogoźno → Jelitowo → Tomaszów → Tomaszów Lubelski
 Waldenberg → Waldenburg → Wałbrzych2
 Wejherowska Wola → Neustadt1 → Wejherowo → Neustadt1 → Wejherowo
 Wielka Wieś → Władysławowo
 Włodzisław → Włocław → Leslau → Włocławek → Leslau → Włocławek2
 Wrocisław → Wrocław → Preßlau1 → Breslau → Wrocław2
 Zabrze → Hindenburg1 → Zabrze2
 Zawadzki → Andreashütte1 → Zawadzkie2
 Frankenstein → Ząbkowice Śląskie2
 Zielona Góra → Grünberg1 → Zielona Góra2

1 Cities in western Poland whose names were changed when Poland gained independence from Germany in 1918.
2 German cities from 1918 to 1939 that became part of Poland after 1945.

Portugal
Aeminium → Coimbra
Bracara Augusta → Braga
Conimbriga → Condeixa-a-Nova (Coimbra)
Iebora → Évora
Olisipo → Al-Usbuna → Lisbon (Lisboa)
Pax Iulia → Beja
Portus Cale → Porto (Oporto) and Vila Nova de Gaia
Sheberina → Serpa
Sintara → Sintra
Villa Euracini (953) → Villa Verazin (1198) → Póvoa de Varzim (1308)

Romania

Russia

Serbia
Despotovica → Gornji Milanovac
Horreum Margi → Ravno → Ćuprija
Jagodina → Svetozarevo → Jagodina
Karanovac → Kraljevo → Rankovićevo → Kraljevo
Nagy Bécskerek/Veliki Bečkerek → Bečkerek → Petrovgrad → Zrenjanin
Petrovaradinski Šanac → Novi Sad 
Poreč → Donji Milanovac
Singidon → Singidunum → Bělgradъ (Бѣлъградъ) → Nándorfehérvár → Dar-ul-Cihad → Beograd (Belgrade) 
Taurunum → Zemun
Sirmium → Sremska Mitrovica
Užice → Titovo Užice (1946) → Užice (1992)
Vrbas → Titov Vrbas (1983) → Vrbas (1992)
Zanes → Pontes → Diana → Novi Grad → Fetislam → Kladovo
Zaslon → Šabac

Seychelles
 L'Établissement → Victoria

Singapore
Bukit Panjang → Zhenghua → Bukit Panjang
Chan Chu Kang → Nee Soon → Yishun†
Kalang → Kallang
Kang Kar → Sengkang
Passier Reis → Pasir Ris
Peck San → Bishan†
Pongal → Ponggol → Punggol
Temasek → Singapore
Westhill → Chong Pang

Name change in English due to replacement of older romanization methods with the pinyin system. The Chinese name is unchanged.

Slovakia
Šafaríkovo → Tornaľa
Šimonovany → Baťovany → Partizánske
Besztercebánya → Banská Bystrica
Kaschau, Kassa → Košice
Pressburg, Pozsony → Bratislava

Slovenia
Assling → Jesenice
Bischofslack → Škofja Loka
Celeia → Cilli → Celje
Egida → Capris → Justinopolis → Caput Histriae → Koper/Capodistria
Emona → Laibach → Ljubljana
Marburg → Maribor
Poetovio → Pettau → Ptuj
Pirano → Piran
Capodistria → Koper
Portorose → Portorož
Velenje → Titovo Velenje (1981) → Velenje (1991)
Castra ad Fluvio Frigido → Ajdovščina
Atrans → Trojane

South Africa

South Korea
Cheju (1397) → Jeju‡
Dalgubeol → Taegu (757 AD) → Daegu‡
Dongrae (before 1914) → Fusan (1914) → Pusan† (1945) → Busan‡
Duingji-hyeon → Yŏn'gi → Yeongi‡ → Sejong (2012)
Usisan → Uhwa → Heungrye-bu → Gonghwa-hyeon → Ulju (1018 AD) → Ulsan (1413)
Hanbat → Taejŏn → Daejeon‡
Mujin → Muju → Kwangju → Gwangju‡
Hansanju → Hanyang → Hanseong → Gyeongseong/Keijō (1910) → Seoul (1945)
Michuhol → Soseong-hyeon → Gyeongwon-bu → Inch'ŏn (1413) → Jinsen† (1910) → Chemulpo (1945)→ Inch'ŏn (1945) → Incheon‡
Ungjin → Kongju → Gongju‡
 Silchon-eup → Gonjiam-eup (Gwangju, Gyeonggi) (2011)
 Doam-myeon → Daegwallyeong-myeon (Pyeongchang) (2007)

†Japanese name during Korea under Japanese rule (1910–1945). The Korean name is unchanged.
‡Name change in English due to replacement McCune-Reischauer with the Revised Romanization method in 2000. The Korean name is unchanged.

Spain
Acci → Guadix
Adobrica → Ferrol → Ferrol del Caudillo (1938) → Ferrol (1982)
Azaña → Numancia de la Sagra (1936)
Barcino → Barcino Nova → Barcelona
Basti → Baza
Bayona de Tajuña → Titulcia
Brigantium → Caronium → Corunna → La Coruña → A Coruña
Caesaraugusta → Zaragoza
Colonia Iulia Romula → Hispalis → Ishbiliya → Seville (Sevilla)
Colonia Norba Caesarina → Norba → Cáceres
Colonia Patricia → Corduba → Qurtuba → Córdoba
Complutum → Alcalá de Henares
Egara → Terrassa
Gasteiz → Nueva Victoria → Vitoria-Gasteiz
Guernica → Guernica y Luno → Gernika-Lumo
Onuba → Huelva
Sos → Sos del Rey Católico
Villa Real → Ciudad Real

Sweden
Bogesund → Ulricehamn
Bro → Christinehamn → Kristinehamn
Malmhaugar → Malmö
Tuna → Eskilstuna → Carl Gustafs Stad  → Eskilstuna
Westra Aros  → Wæstaros → Västerås
Östra Aros → Upsala → Uppsala

Switzerland
Aarmühle → Interlaken
Augusta Raurica → Kaiseraugst
Aventicum → Wiflispurg → Avenches
Eburodunum → Yverdon-les-Bains
Lousonna → Lausanne
Minnodunum → Moudon
Octodurus → Martigny
Turicum → Zürich

Syria
 Beroea → Aleppo
 Balanea (Greek, Latin) → Baniyas (Arabic) 
 Emesa → Homs
 (H)Amat(h)(a) (Aramean, Assyrian) → Epiphania → Epiphania, Emath(oùs) (Greek) →  Hamath → Hama
 Laodicea ad Mare → Latakia
 Palmyra → Tadmor
 Rasaappa, Rasappa, Rasapi (Akadian) → Sergiopolis → Anastasiopolis (Greek, Latin) → Risapa, Rosafa (Latin) → Resafa (Arabic)

Taiwan 
Quemoy → Kinmen
Tamsui → Danshui → Tamsui
Sindian† → Xindian
†Chinese name unchanged.

Tajikistan

Tanzania
Bismarckburg → Kasanga
Tabora → Weidmannsheil → Tabora

Thailand
Ayothaya → Ayutthaya (1237)
Bangkok → Phra Nakhon (1782) → Krung Thep (1972)
Trat → Trach → Trat (1906)

Turkey

Turkmenistan

Ukraine

United Kingdom

England
Londinium → Lundenwic → Lundone → London (Latin: Londinium; Old English: Lunden)
Camulodunon (Celtic) → Camulodunum, Colonia Claudia Victricensis (Roman) → Colneceastre (10th century) → Colchester
Eboracum, Eburacum → Eoforwic (7th century) → Jórvík → York
Duroliponte (Roman) → Grantebrycge (9th century) → Cantabrigia (16th century) → Cambridge
Monkchester → Newcastle upon Tyne (1080s)
Celmeresfort → Chelmsford (1189)
Lyme → Lyme Regis (1284)
Beeston → Beeston Regis (1399)
Lynn → King's Lynn (16th century)
Leamington Priors → Royal Leamington Spa (1838)
Cambridge Town → Camberley (1877)
Tunbridge Wells → Royal Tunbridge Wells (1909)
Bognor → Bognor Regis (1929)
Piddletown → Puddletown (late 1950s)
Wootton Bassett → Royal Wootton Bassett (2011)
Staines → Staines-upon-Thames (2012)
Benfleet → Beamfleot → (1855) Benfleota, Bienflet, Beanflota, Bemflet, Bamflet, Beniflet, Baunflet and Bewinflete

Scotland
Ardencaple → Helensburgh
Cadȝow → Hamilton (15th century)
Cartleyhole, Clarty Hole → Abbotsford
Conveth → Laurencekirk
Dunedin (and variants) → Edinburgh
Friock  → Friockheim
Hamnavoe → Stromness
Kiliwhimin  → Fort Augustus (18th century)
Kilrule, Kilrymont → St Andrews
Kilbride → West Kilbride
Kilbride → East Kilbride
Maryburgh → Gordonsburgh → Duncansburgh → Fort William
Navermouth (Am Blàran Odhar) → Bettyhill
Newark → Port Glasgow (1775)
Obbe → Leverburgh (1920)
St John's Toun, St Johnstone → Perth
Milton of Strathbogie  → Huntly
Vale of Leven → Alexandria

Northern Ireland
Ballinascreen → Draperstown (1818)
Cromlin → Hillsborough (1661) → Royal Hillsborough (2021)
Derry → Londonderry (1613)
Legacorry → Richhill
Lisnagarvy → Lisburn (1662)
Muff → Eglinton (1858)

United States

Alaska
Barrow → Utqiaġvik
Novoarkhangelsk → Sitka

Arizona
Swilling's Mill → Hellinwg Mill → Mill City → East Phoenix → Phoenix

California
Baden → South San Francisco
Bakersville →  Waterford
El Toro → Lake Forest
Grover City → Grover Beach
Nordoff → Ojai
Todos Santos → Concord
Tuleburg → Stockton
Wineville → Mira Loma
Yerba Buena → San Francisco

Colorado
Fletcher → Aurora
Union Colony → Greeley

Connecticut
Conway → Portland
East Middletown → Chatham → East Hampton
Fort Hoop → Newtowne →  Hartford
Mattianuck → Dorchester → Windsor
Mettabasett → Middletown 
Orford Parish → Manchester 
Pyquag → Wethersfield
Saybrooke Colony → Saybrook → Deep River
Southfield → Suthfield → Suffield
Wintonbury → Bloomfield

Delaware
Fort Casimir → Fort Trefaldighet → New Amstel → New Castle
Fort Christina → Fort Altena → Wilmington
Zwaanendael → Lewes

Florida
Alligator → Lake City
Jernigan → Orlando
Lake Worth → Lake Worth Beach
Saint Petersburg Beach → St. Pete Beach

Georgia
Terminus → Marthasville → Atlanta

Idaho
Desmet → Tensed
Eagle Rock → Idaho Falls
Market Lake → Roberts

Illinois
 Alcoa → Alorton — in St. Clair County
 Allin → Stanford — in McLean County
 Amity → Pocohontas — in Bond County; name also used for an old plat in Cornell, Livingston County
 Ardmore → Villa Park — in DuPage County
 Area → Mundelein — in Lake County
 Athens → New Athens — in St. Clair County; name now used by Athens, Menard County
 Baden → New Baden — in Clinton and St. Clair counties
 Beechwood → Mounds — in Pulaski County
 Benton → Williamsville — in Sangamon County
 Berrian → Kewanee — in Henry County
 Blackberry → Elburn — in Kane County
 Bolton → Stonefort — in Saline and Williamson counties
 Bowensburg → Bowen — in Hancock County
 Bradly City → Bradley — in Kankakee County
 Butler → Cherry Valley — in Winnebago County; name now used by Butler, Montgomery County
 Camden → Lincoln — in Logan County; name now used by Camden, Schuyler County
 Camden Mills → Milan — in Rock Island County
 Centerville → Cuba — in Fulton County; name also used for several other settlements named Centerville
 Centerville → Millstadt — in St. Clair County; name also used for several other settlements named Centerville
 Centerville → Ripley — in Brown County; name also used for several other settlements named Centerville
 Centerville → Woodstock — in McHenry County; name also used for several other settlements named Centerville
 Charleston → Brimfield — in Peoria County; name now used by Charleston, Coles County
 Charleston → St. Charles — in DuPage and Kane counties; name now used by Charleston, Coles County
 Charleston → St. Charles — in Kane and DuPage counties; name now used by Charleston, Coles County
 Chatham → Sterling — in Whiteside County; name now used by Chatham, Sangamon County
 Chillicothe → Indianola — in Vermilion County; name now used by Chillicothe, Peoria County
 Clarkesville or Clarksville → Sciota — in McDonough County; name also used for unincorporated Clarksville, Coles County
 Clement → Huey — in Clinton County
 Clintonville → South Elgin — in Kane County
 Coloma → Du Bois — in Washington County
 Concord → Danvers — in McLean County; name now used by Concord, Morgan County
 Crescent → Crescent City — in Iroquois County
 Crotty → Seneca — in Grundy and LaSalle counties
 Dallas → Indianola — in Vermilion County
 Dement → Creston — in Ogle County
 Dunleith → East Dubuque — in Jo Daviess County
 East Chicago Heights → Ford Heights — in Cook County
 East Wood River → Wood River — in Madison County
 Elk Hart City → Elkhart — in Logan County
 Ellsworth → Lostant — in LaSalle County; name now used by Ellsworth, McLean County
 Elyda → Winnebago — in Winnebago County
 Emporium City → Mound City — in Pulaski County
 Fairfield → Mendon — in Adams County; name now used by Fairfield, Wayne County
 Fairfield → Pleasant Hill — in Pike County; name now used by Fairfield, Wayne County
 Florence → Oregon — in Ogle County; name now used by Florence, Pike County
 Fordville → Energy — in Williamson County
 Fordyce → Gorham — in Jackson County
 Fort Dearborn → Chicago
 Ft. Sheridan → Highwood — in Lake County
 Georgetown → Newark — in Kendall County; name now used by Georgetown, Vermilion County
 Georgetown → Steeleville — in Randolph County; name now used by Georgetown, Vermilion County
 Glascoe → Glasford — in Peoria County
 Glendale → Glendale Heights — in DuPage County; name also used for unincorporated Glendale, Pope County
 Grand Cote → Coulterville — in Randolph County
 Greenfield → LaMoille — in Bureau County; name now used by Greenfield, Greene County
 Grossdale → Brookfield — in Cook County
 Halidayburg → Kane — in Greene County
 Hanover → Metamora — in Woodford County; name now used by Hanover, Jo Daviess County
 Harlem → Forest Park — in Cook County; name also used for unincorporated Harlem, Winnebago County
 Harrison → Cedarville — in Stephenson County; name also used for two unincorporated places named Harrison
 Harvester → Burr Ridge — in DuPage County
 Henderson → Knoxville — in Knox Township, Knox County east of Galesburg; name now used by nearby Henderson, Henderson Township, Knox County north of Galesburg
 Hilton → East Peoria — in Tazewell County
 Howard → Durand — in Winnebago County
 Howlet → Riverton — in Sangamon County
 Humphrey → Tovey — in Christian County
 Huston → Mulberry Grove — in Bond County
 Illinoistown → East St. Louis — in St. Clair County
 Independence → Oakland — in Coles County
 Indiantown → Tiskilwa — in Bureau County
 Jamestown → Riverton — in Sangamon County; name also used for unincorporated Jamestown, Clinton County
 Juliet → Joliet — in Will County
 Keokuk Junction → Golden — in Adams County
 Lane → Rochelle — in Ogle County; name also used for unincorporated Lane, DeWitt County
 Lapier → Altona — in Knox County
 Laurel Hill → Table Grove — in Fulton County
 Liberty → Burnt Prairie — in White County; name now used by Liberty, Adams County
 Liberty → Rockwood — in Randolph County; name now used by other Liberty, Adams County
 Little Fort → Waukegan — in Lake County
 Lodi → Maple Park — in Kane County; also other communities formerly named Lodi
 Lysander → Pecatonica — in Winnebago County
 Mantua → Washburn — in Woodford County
 Marysville → Potomac — in Vermilion County
 Mechanicsburg → Mascoutah — in St. Clair County; name now used by Mechanicsburg, Sangamon County
 Melrose → Melrose Park — in Cook County; name also used for unincorporated Melrose, Clark County
 Middleton → Iuka — in Marion County
 Midway → Kansas — in Edgar County; name also used for several unincorporated places named Midway
 Mill Creek → Old Mill Creek — in Lake County; name now used by Mill Creek, Union County
 Millersburg → Pierron — in Bond and Madison counties; name also used for unincorporated Millersburg, Mercer County
 Milton → Humboldt — in Coles County; name now used by Milton, Pike County
 Monsanto → Sauget — in St. Clair County
 Morristown → New Milford — in Winnebago County
 Mt. Pleasant → Farmer City — in DeWitt County
 New Liberty → Willow Hill — in Jasper County; name now used by New Liberty, Pope County
 New Rutland → Rutland — in LaSalle County
 New Salem → West Salem — in Edwards County; also the name of several unincorporated places named New Salem
 Niles Centre → Skokie — in Cook County
 North Bloomington → Normal — in McLean County
 Oak Grove → Green Oaks — in Lake County; name now used by Oak Grove, Rock Island County
 Oak Grove Park → Germantown Hills — in Woodford County
 Oak Grove Park → Oak Grove — in Rock Island County
 Oakbrook → Oak Brook — in DuPage County
 Ogle Station → Ashton — in Lee County
 Park Forest South → University Park — in Cook and Will counties
 Pecatonica → Rockton — in Rockton Township, Winnebago County; name now used by Pecatonica, Pecatonica Township, Winnebago County
 Pembroke → Hopkins Park — in Kankakee County
 Pleasantville → Ipava — in Fulton County
 Portland → Blue Island — in Cook County
 Portland → Oglesby — in LaSalle County
 Postville → Lincoln — in Logan County
 Prairie City → Toledo — in Cumberland County; name now used by Prairie City, McDonough County
 Prospect Park → Glen Ellyn — in DuPage County
 Rand → Des Plaines — in Cook County
 Randall → East Galesburg — in Knox County
 Rantoul → Alma — in Marion County; name now used by Rantoul, Champaign County
 Reeves → Cambria — in Williamson County
 Richmond → Richview — in Washington County; name now used by Richmond, McHenry County
 Ridgeville → Evanston — in Cook County
 Rome → Dix — in Jefferson County; name also used for unincorporated Rome, Peoria County
 Rose Clare → Rosiclare — in Hardin County
 Saline → Grantfork — in Madison County
 Schaumburg Center → Schaumburg — in Cook County
 Sheridan → Good Hope — in McDonough County; name now used by Sheridan, LaSalle County
 Shermerville → Northbrook — in Cook County
 South Pass → Cobden — in Union County
 Specialville → Dixmoor — in Cook County
 Spring Forest → Willow Springs — in Cook and DuPage counties
 St. Marye → Beaverville — in Iroquois County
 Stephenson → Rock Island — in Rock Island County
 Sunnyside → Johnsburg — in McHenry County
 Sunrise Ridge → Wonder Lake — in McHenry County
 Sutton → Bentley — in Hancock County; name also used for unincorporated Sutton, Cook County
 Tazewell → Spring Bay — in Woodford County
 Tessville → Lincolnwood — in Cook County
 Turner → West Chicago — in DuPage County
 Uniontown → Washburn — in Woodford County; name also used for unincorporated Uniontown, Knox County
 Urbana → Freeburg — in St. Clair County; name now used by Urbana, Champaign County
 Utopia → Oakbrook Terrace — in DuPage County
 Van Buren → St. Francisville — in Lawrence County
 Victoria → Phillipstown — in White County; name now used by Victoria, Knox County
 Vienna → Astoria — in Fulton County; name now used by Vienna, Johnson County
 Waldron → Aroma Park — in Kankakee County
 Walnut Grove → Altona — in Knox County; name also used for unincorporated places named Walnut Grove
 Wappello → Hanover — in Jo Daviess County
 Wau-Bun → Northfield — in Cook County
 West Hammond → Calumet City — in Cook County
 Westhaven → Orland Hills — in Cook County
 Whitfield → Leland — in LaSalle County
 Wilson → Illiopolis — in Sangamon County; name also used for unincorporated Wilson, Lake County
 Winchester → Wilmington — in Will County; name now used by Winchester, Scott County
 Windsor → Tiskilwa — in Bureau County; name now used by Windsor, Shelby County and as the usual name for legal New Windsor, Mercer County
 Wiona → Malden — in Bureau County
 Worcester → Barry — in Pike County
 Xenia → Atlanta — in Logan County; name now used by Xenia, Clay County
 Yellow Creek → Pearl City — in Loran Township, Stephenson County; name also used for nearby unincorporated Yellow Creek, Kent Township, Stephenson County
 York → Thomson — in Carroll County; name also used for unincorporated York, Clark County
 Young America → Kirkwood — in Warren County

Iowa
Columbus → Cedar Rapids
Kanesville → Council Bluffs
Springfield → Maquoketa
Valley Junction → West Des Moines

Kentucky 
 Minor Lane Heights → Heritage Creek

Louisiana
Vermilionville → Lafayette

Maryland
Berlin → Brunswick
Elizabeth Town → Hagerstown
Germantown → Perry Hall
Head of Elk → Elkton
Newtown → Leonardtown
Providence → Anne Arundel Towne → Annapolis
Riverdale → Riverdale Park
Caiuctucuc → Wills Creek → Cumberland

Massachusetts
Agawam Plantation → Springfield
Cold Spring → Belcher's Town → Belchertown
Dale of Hope → Hopedale
Fall River → Troy → Fall River
Gay Head → Aquinnah
Glasgow → Blandford
Ireland Parish → Ireland → Holyoke
Manchester → Manchester-by-the-Sea
Marlbury → Marlborough
Menotomy → Arlington
Minnechaug → South Wilbraham → Hampden
Quaboage → Quaboag → Brookfield
Shawmut → Boston
Stony Hill → Ludlow

Michigan
Avon Township → Rochester Hills, Michigan
Berlin → Marne
Bronson → Kalamazoo
East Detroit → Eastpointe
Fort Pontchartrain du Détroit → Detroit
Harlow → Hog's Hallow → McDouglasville → Utica
Jefferson → Sterling Heights
Swainsville → Brooklyn

Minnesota
Imnizaska → Pig's Eye → St. Paul

Nebraska
Lancaster → Lincoln

Nevada
Horn Silver → Hornsilver → Goldpoint → Gold Point

New Hampshire
Derryfield → Manchester
Hilton's Pointe → Cochecho → Northam → Dover
Nashuway → Nashville → Nashua
Number Two → Middle Monadnock → Monadnock → Jaffrey
Nutfield → Londonderry 
Plantation of Penney Cook → Penney Cook → Pennacook → Rumford → Concord
Piscatiqua → Strawberry Hill → Portsmouth 
Suncook → Pembroke
Winnacunnet → Hampton

New Jersey
Acquackanonk → Clifton
Awiehawken → Weehawken
Bergen → Jersey City
Boiling Springs Township → East Rutherford
Delford → Oradell
East Paterson → Elmwood Park
Fort Nassau → Gloucester City
Hunt's Mills → Clinton
Madison Township (Middlesex County) → Old Bridge Township
Maidenhead Township → Lawrence Township
Matawan Township → Aberdeen
Nya Stockholm → Bridgeport
Passaic Township → Long Hill Township
Raritan Township (Monmouth County) → Hazlet
Second River → Belleville
Sodon → Glen Gardner
South Orange Township → Maplewood
Sveaborg → Swedesboro
Turkey or Turkey Town → New Providence
Washington Township → Robbinsville Township
West Paterson → Woodland Park
Delaware Township → Cherry Hill Township

New Mexico
Alburquerque → Albuquerque
Hot Springs → Truth or Consequences

New York
Beverwijck → Albany
Breuckelen → Brooklyn (borough of New York City)
Fort Nassau → Fort Orange → Albany → Willemstad → Albany
Heemstede → Hempstead
New Amsterdam → New York → New Orange → New York City
North Tarrytown → Sleepy Hollow
Sing Sing → Ossining, New York
Staaten Eylandt → Staten Island (borough of New York City)
Wiltwyck → Kingston

North Carolina
Atkins Bank → Kingston → Kinston → Caswel → Kinston
Campbellton + Cross Creek → Fayetteville
Fuquay Springs and Varina → Fuquay-Varina
Pacific → Youngsville (1875)
Wachau → Salem → Winston-Salem

Ohio
Cleaveland → Cleveland
Gamble's Mill → Shelby
Losantiville → Cincinnati
Sellstown  → Dublin

Oregon
Halfway → Half.com → Halfway
Marysville → Corvallis
Skinner's Mudhole →  Eugene City → Eugene

Pennsylvania
Ammansland → Darby
Augustatown → Washington
Bridgetown → Midway → Coates’ Villa → Coatesville
Chamassungh → Finlandia → Marcus Hook
Cross Keys → Intercourse
Fort Duquesne → Pittsburgh → Pittsburg* → Pittsburgh
Mauch Chunk → Jim Thorpe
Mölndal → Yeadon
Northampton → Allentown
Presque Isle → Erie
Printztorp → Chester
Steitztown → Lebanon
Tequirassy → Eddystone
Upland → Chester

Name used by the United States Board on Geographic Names from 1891 to 1911. The name used by the city in its official documents and on its seal was unchanged.

Rhode Island
Gloucester → Glocester
Haversham → Westerly 
Kings Towne → Kingstown → Rochester → North Kingstown 
Shawomet → Warwick

South Carolina
Charles Towne → Charleston
Jeffers → Blaney → Elgin
Kingston → Conwayborough → Conway
Tacapua → Startex

Tennessee
Alexandria → Jackson
Coal Creek → Lake City → Rocky Top
Fort Nashborough → Nashville
Taylorsville → Mountain City

Texas
Clark → DISH
Dechman → Deckman → Grand Prairie
Duncan Switch → Duncanville
Emerson → Frisco City → Frisco
Fillmore → Plano (1852)
Gorbit → Kit → Irving
Presidio San Antonio de Bexar → San Antonio
Waterloo → Austin

Utah
Evansville → Lehi
Grayson → Blanding
Great Salt Lake City → Salt Lake City
Pleasant Green → Magna

Vermont
Brattleborough → Brattleboro

Virginia
Kecoughtan → Hampton
Mt. Pleasant → Mt. Jackson
Mud Lick→ Big Lick → Roanoke
Shryock → Edinburg
Staufferstadt → Strasburg
Tom's Creek → Toms Brook
Tysons Corner → Tysons

Washington
Neppel → Moses Lake
North Yakima → Yakima
Spokane Falls → Spokane
Tolt → Carnation → Tolt → Carnation
Vera  → Veradale
Yakima City → Union Gap

Wisconsin
Prairieville → Waukesha
Rochester → Sheboygan Falls

Uzbekistan

Venezuela
Angostura → Ciudad Bolívar (1846)
Santiago de León de Caracas → Caracas

Vietnam
Tourane → Đà Nẵng
Djiring → Di Linh
Tống Bình → Long Đỗ → Đại La → Thăng Long → Đông Đô → Đông Kinh → Bắc Thành → Thăng Long → Hà Nội (Hanoi)
Hai Pho → Faifo → Hội An
Prey Nokor → Gia Định → Sài Gòn (Saigon) → Thành Phố Hồ Chí Minh (Ho Chi Minh City)
Phu Xuan → Huế
Ke Van → Ke Vinh → Vinh Giang → Vinh Doanh → Vinh Thi → Vinh

Zambia

Zimbabwe

See also
List of administrative division name changes
Neighborhood rebranding in New York City

Sources and references

Westermann, Großer Atlas zur Weltgeschichte (in German)
 Of Bangalore, Bengaluru and Belagavi
   List compiled by the (Greek) National Documentation Centre (EKT)

Lists of former place names
Renamed

Lists by country